Sarangesa laelius, commonly known as the grey elfin, is a species of butterfly in the family Hesperiidae. It is found in Mauritania, Senegal, Gambia, Mali, Guinea, northern Ivory Coast, northern and central Ghana, Togo, northern Nigeria, southern Sudan, Uganda, Ethiopia, Kenya, Tanzania, Malawi, northern Zambia and Zimbabwe. The habitat consists of woodland and dry Guinea savanna.

The adults of both sexes are attracted to flowers.

References

Butterflies described in 1877
Celaenorrhinini
Butterflies of Africa
Taxa named by Paul Mabille